Attapulgus is a city in Decatur County, Georgia, United States. As of the 2020 census, the city had a population of 454.

The town's name is an Indian word meaning "Dogwood"; due to the abundance of attapulgite, which makes up the clay soil throughout much of the Southeast, the mineral was named after the town.

Attapulgus was the birthplace of civil rights leader Hosea Williams (1926-2000), who is said to have been run out of town by a lynch mob at the age of 13. He is remembered around the world for his close association with Dr. Martin Luther King Jr., and for leading, with John Lewis, the famous march across the Edmund Pettus Bridge in Selma, Alabama, in 1965 that led to the passage of the landmark Voting Rights Act of 1965. Williams served on the Atlanta City Council, the DeKalb County Commission, and in the Georgia Senate. He also started a program to feed the hungry that has continued long after his death.

Geography
Attapulgus is located at  (30.748243, -84.483810).

The city is located near the Georgia-Florida state line. U.S. Route 27 bypasses the city to the east, leading northwest  to Bainbridge, the Decatur County seat, and southeast  to Tallahassee, Florida. Georgia State Route 241 connects the city with the Florida state line  to the southwest.

Demographics

As of the census of 2000, there were 492 people, 179 households, and 129 families residing in the city. The racial makeup of the city was 43.09% White, 50.00% African American, 0.41% Native American, 4.07% from other races, and 2.44% from two or more races. Hispanic or Latino of any race were 7.93% of the population.

There were 179 households, out of which 31.8% had children under the age of 18 living with them, 49.2% were married couples living together, 16.2% had a female householder with no husband present, and 27.4% were non-families. 25.7% of all households were made up of individuals, and 11.7% had someone living alone who was 65 years of age or older. The average household size was 2.75 and the average family size was 3.29.

In the city, the population was spread out, with 28.7% under the age of 18, 9.1% from 18 to 24, 27.4% from 25 to 44, 20.3% from 45 to 64, and 14.4% who were 65 years of age or older. The median age was 34 years. For every 100 females, there were 98.4 males. For every 100 females age 18 and over, there were 86.7 males.

The median income for a household in the city was $25,625, and the median income for a family was $29,167. Males had a median income of $23,750 versus $16,477 for females. The per capita income for the city was $11,204. About 16.7% of families and 26.0% of the population were below the poverty line, including 45.9% of those under age 18 and 12.7% of those age 65 or over.

BASF Attapulgus - The plant is in southwest Georgia (Decatur County), about 15 miles east of Lake Seminole (Faceville, Georgia) and 20 miles north of Lake Jackson (Tallahassee, Florida). Economic Impact: Annual payroll of $19.9 million, Payment of $1.34 million in local and state taxes, Capital investment of $8.0 million in new plant equipment.

References

External links
 Attapulgus historical marker
 Attapulgus Cemetery historical marker
 Attapulgus High School historical marker
 Attapulgus Presbyterian Cemetery historical marker
 BASF - https://www.basf.com/us/en.html
 https://www.georgiaencyclopedia.org/articles/history-archaeology/hosea-williams-1926-2000

Cities in Georgia (U.S. state)
Cities in Decatur County, Georgia